Karachevsky District is an administrative and municipal district (raion), one of the twenty-seven in Bryansk Oblast, Russia. It is located in the east of the oblast. Its administrative center is the town of Karachev. Population:   37,857 (2002 Census);  The population of Karachev accounts for 54.1% of the district's total population.

References

Notes

Sources

Districts of Bryansk Oblast